Kupino is a town and the administrative center of Kupinsky District in Novosibirsk Oblast, Russia, located  west of Novosibirsk, the administrative center of the oblast. Population:

History
It was founded in 1886 and was granted town status in 1944.

During the Cold War, Kupino air base was operated by the Soviet Air Force east of the town.

Administrative and municipal status
Within the framework of administrative divisions, Kupino serves as the administrative center of Kupinsky District. As an administrative division, it is incorporated within Kupinsky District as the Town of Kupino. As a municipal division, the Town of Kupino is incorporated within Kupinsky Municipal District as Kupino Urban Settlement.

References

Notes

Sources

Cities and towns in Novosibirsk Oblast